Liam Kirk (born 3 January 2000) is a British professional ice hockey left winger for Mikkelin Jukurit of the Finnish Liiga on loan as a prospect under contract to the Arizona Coyotes of the National Hockey League (NHL). Kirk began his career with the British Elite Ice Hockey League club the Sheffield Steelers.

Internationally, Kirk has played for the British national team, helping them win promotion to the Elite Division at the 2018 IIHF World Championship Division I tournament, before playing an important role in the 2021 World Championship.

In June 2018, Kirk was drafted in the 2018 NHL Entry Draft by the Arizona Coyotes, becoming the first player born and trained in England to be selected by an NHL team.

Playing career

Sheffield Steelers
Growing up in Maltby, a small former mining town in South Yorkshire, Kirk first got into hockey when his parents and family went to watch the Sheffield Steelers. His brother Jonathan got into ice hockey and Kirk wanted to be like his brother, so he also started playing.
 
Kirk began playing for the Sheffield Junior Academy. He was selected for the Midlands Conference – a team consisting of the best players from the Midlands region of the UK at U11, U13, U15 and U17 level – every year of eligibility, winning the EIHA Conference Tournament twice and being named a tournament all-star six times out of a possible eight, as well as being named tournament MVP three times.

Playing in the England U18 North League in the 2015–16 season, Kirk amassed a league-leading 98 points, with 60 goals and 38 assists. The same year, the U18 team from Sheffield won the league title. He was also selected for the Great Britain U16s.
 
Continuing his success as an U18, Kirk played in the EPL for the Sheffield Steeldogs (league now defunct) and was signed by the Sheffield Steelers on a three-year apprentice contract.

Junior
Kirk was selected 189th overall (in the 7th Round) in the 2018 NHL Entry Draft by the Arizona Coyotes. He became the first player born and trained in England to be drafted into the NHL. Kirk was selected 8th overall in the CHL Import Draft later in June and played for the Peterborough Petes of the Ontario Hockey League (OHL).

European loan spells
With the 2020–21 OHL season not scheduled to begin until December 2020, due to the COVID-19 pandemic, Kirk opted to remain in Europe initially signing a loan for Swedish Hockeyettan side Hanhals IF on a short-term deal on 17 October 2020. 

In February 2021, Kirk temporarily returned to the UK by signing on loan with NIHL side Sheffield Steeldogs ahead of their Spring Cup series. In March 2021, Kirk was named as part of the Sheffield Steelers squad for the 2021 'Elite Series'.

Arizona Coyotes
On 18 June 2021, Kirk signed a three-year, entry-level contract with the Coyotes. On 28 July 2021, the Coyotes officially announced Kirk was signed to a three-year, entry-level contract with the club, becoming the first English born and trained player to sign an NHL contract.

He started the 2021–22 season in the AHL with the Coyotes' affiliate, the Tucson Roadrunners. Kirk played in eight matches, scoring two goals and three points, before suffering a season-ending knee injury in November 2021.

Returning to health for the 2022–23 season, Kirk continued his tenure in the AHL with the Tucson Roadrunners. Serving as a healthy scratch and featuring in just a solitary game with the Roadrunners, Kirk was re-assigned by the Coyotes to secondary affiliate, the Atlanta Gladiators of the ECHL. Kirk registered 5 goals and 11 points through 15 games with the Gladiators before accepting a loan assignment from the Coyotes to return to Europe in joining Finnish top flight club, Mikkelin Jukurit of the Liiga, for the remainder of the season on 29 December 2022.

International play
Kirk has played for the British national team in several international tournaments at both the junior and senior level.

In the 2017–18 season, he played for the U18s, coming away with a gold medal. For the U20s, he collected a range of awards such as Best Forward, Most Points, Most Assists, Most Goals, as well as the Best Face-off Percentage (71.43%) and a bronze medal.

His senior debut came at the 2018 IIHF World Championship Division I, where he helped Great Britain earn promotion to the 2019 World Championship. It marked Great Britain's first appearance in the elite division since 1994. Kirk played five games, though he did not score a point.

Two years later, Kirk starred for Great Britain at the 2021 IIHF World Championship - scoring his first senior points and going on to finish joint-top of the goalscoring charts with seven goals in seven matches. 

Kirk, who finished with nine points to his name, also helped Great Britain to a first regulation time win at the elite level since 1962 with a 4-3 win over Belarus on 26 May 2021, and an overall team points tally of four. He was named in the all-star team for his performance.

Career statistics

Regular season and playoffs

International

Awards and honours

References

External links

2000 births
Living people
Arizona Coyotes draft picks
Atlanta Gladiators players
English ice hockey forwards
Mikkelin Jukurit players
Sheffield Steelers players
Peterborough Petes (ice hockey) players
People from Maltby, South Yorkshire
Sportspeople from South Yorkshire
Tucson Roadrunners players
British expatriate ice hockey people
English expatriate sportspeople in the United States
English expatriate sportspeople in Canada
English expatriate sportspeople in Sweden
English expatriate sportspeople in Finland
Expatriate ice hockey players in the United States
Expatriate ice hockey players in Canada
Expatriate ice hockey players in Sweden
Expatriate ice hockey players in Finland